Bethany is a former station of the Berlin Missionary Society established in 1834 by Gebel and Kraul to serve the Korana. Hebrew for 'house of misery'. The railway station was renamed Wurasoord in 1919, after C Wuras, who took charge of it then.

References

Populated places in the Kopanong Local Municipality